Omar Al-Ruwaili (born 17 March 1999) is a Saudi Arabian professional footballer who plays as a striker for Al-Riyadh on loan from Abha.

Career
Al-Ruwailli began his career in the youth setups of Al-Orobah. He made his debut during the second half of the 2018–19 season. In his first full season at the club, Al-Ruwaili scored 7 goals in 15 appearances in the Saudi Second Division. He scored his first goal on 25 January 2020 in the 2–1 defeat to Al-Safa. On 14 February 2020, he scored his first hattrick in the 6–3 win against Al-Kholood. On 17 November 2020, Al-Ruwaili signed a three-year contract with Pro League side Abha. He made his debut on 19 January 2021 in the 3–0 defeat to Al-Ahli. On 16 January 2023, Al-Ruwaili joined Al-Riyadh on a six-month loan.

Career statistics

Club

References

External links 
 

1999 births
Living people
Saudi Arabian footballers
Saudi Arabia youth international footballers
Al-Orobah FC players
Abha Club players
Al-Riyadh SC players
Saudi First Division League players
Saudi Second Division players
Saudi Professional League players
Association football forwards